Carleth Revete, known professionally as Carleth Keys (pronounced car-LET), is a Venezuelan news anchor and reporter and former print journalist and television program host.

Early life 
Keys was born and raised in Puerto Ordaz, Venezuela. She attended the Universidad Católica Andrés Bello, where she studied mass communications. In 2000, she immigrated to the United States, residing in Tampa, Florida. In 2007, she moved to New York City.

Professional background

Print journalism 
Keys started her journalism career reporting for El Nacional newspaper in Caracas, Venezuela. In 2000, after immigrating to the US, she wrote for a trilingual newspaper in Ybor City, Florida, called La Gaceta.

Television journalism 
Keys has served as the news anchor and managing editor for Bay News 9 En Español, which broadcasts in the Tampa Bay area.

She moved to New York in 2007, where she was a prime time news anchor for NY1 Noticias, a 24-hour local cable news channel that broadcasts in New York City. She was also the host for the fashion and celebrity show De Moda, a Spanish language Webcast that is broadcast in Yahoo! en Español.

Filmography 
In 2004, Keys appeared as a Spanish news anchor in The Punisher.

Honors and awards 
 2003: Hispanic Media Woman of the Year as named by the Tampa Hispanic Heritage Committee
 2004: Suncoast Chapter Emmy nomination for best series
 2004: Finalist for the Tampa Bay Business Journal's Business Woman of the Year Award in Media
 2006: AP Florida Awards winner of the best short hard feature
 2008: One of the most outstanding Venezuelans abroad by El Universal newspaper, in its 99th anniversary edition

References

External links 
 

Venezuelan emigrants to the United States
Spanish reporters and correspondents
Television anchors from Tampa, Florida
People from Ciudad Guayana
Living people
Year of birth missing (living people)
Television anchors from New York City